Taintlight is a 2009 American direct-to-video spoof horror film written and directed by Chris Seaver and starring Meredith Host, Kurt Indovina, and A.J. Stabbone. It a parody of the 2008 film Twilight.

Premise
When lovely young Stella (Meredith Host) strikes up a romance with pale, brooding vampire Edgar Mullens (Kurt Indovina), the couple must navigate the treacherous waters of human-undead love and fend off the amorous advances of a werewolf named Jack (A.J. Stabbone). Meanwhile, another brood of bloodsuckers seeks to impale Edgar and claim Stella for themselves.

Cast
 Meredith Host as Stella
 Kurt Indovina as Edgar Mullens
 A.J. Stabbone as Jack
 Jesse Green as Razor
 Jesse Ames as Veronica
 Miranda Bonetwig as Rosalis
 Billy Garberina as Tobius / Raoul
 Andrew Baltes as Rathbone / Mime
 Chris Seaver as Jock de Queaf
 Jessica Stephens as Jessey
 Jason McCall as T-Bone

Home media
Taintlight was released directly to DVD on November 17, 2009 by Tempe Video's horror spoof label Splatter Rampage.

Reception
Critical reception has been predominantly negative. heavy.com panned the film, writing that it "is not the worst movie I’ve ever seen, but that’s only because it’s 30 minutes shorter than Sorority Girls’ Revenge, and when you get to a certain level of awfulness, it only matters how long it lasts." The Washington Post also wrote a brief, negative review of the film where they remarked that Taintlight was "a "Twilight" spoof that was too sorry for even a single review on RottenTomatoes.com." In his book Fervid Filmmaking, Mike Watt wrote that the lead actors' impressions of Kristen Stewart and Robert Pattinson were "dead on".

References

External links
 
 
 

2009 films
2000s comedy horror films
2000s satirical films
American comedy horror films
American satirical films
2009 independent films
2009 comedy films
2000s English-language films
2000s American films